Concors Latvian Air Service was an airline based in Riga, Latvia. Founded in 1991, it operated regional and international charter flights out of Riga International Airport between 1995 and 2005.

Fleet

As of March 2007, the Concors fleet included of only one small aircraft, a Let L-410 UVP.

Previous fleet:
1x Il-18D
1x YAK-42D

References

Defunct airlines of Latvia
Airlines established in 1991
Airlines disestablished in 2005
1991 establishments in Latvia
2005 disestablishments in Latvia
Latvian companies established in 1991